Anastasia Dmitrievna Guzhenkova (born 16 August 1997) is a Russian swimmer. She competed in the women's 200 metre freestyle event at the 2017 World Aquatics Championships.

References

External links
 

1997 births
Living people
Russian female freestyle swimmers
Place of birth missing (living people)
Universiade medalists in swimming
European Aquatics Championships medalists in swimming
Universiade gold medalists for Russia
Universiade silver medalists for Russia
Medalists at the 2017 Summer Universiade
Swimmers at the 2020 Summer Olympics
Olympic swimmers of Russia